Bachelors' Paradise is a 1939 German comedy film directed by Kurt Hoffmann and starring Heinz Rühmann, Josef Sieber, and Hans Brausewetter. It was based on a novel by Johannes Boldt. It was shot at the Babelsberg Studios in Berlin with sets designed by the art director Willi Herrmann. The film featured the popular song "Das kann doch einen Seemann nicht erschüttern".

Synopsis
After getting his second divorce, Hugo Bartels and his two ex-military comrades agree a pact to form a "paradise for bachelors" club in which all are pledged never to get married again. However, when Hugo meets and falls in love with an attractive woman he faces as a quandary. He is eventually able to marry her after introducing his friends to his two ex-wives who also fall in love.

Cast

References

Bibliography

External links 
 

1939 films
Films of Nazi Germany
German comedy films
1939 comedy films
1930s German-language films
Films directed by Kurt Hoffmann
Films based on German novels
German black-and-white films
Terra Film films
Films shot at Babelsberg Studios
1930s German films